
Gmina Lelis is a rural gmina (administrative district) in Ostrołęka County, Masovian Voivodeship, in east-central Poland.

Villages
Gmina Lelis contains the villages and settlements of Białobiel, Dąbrówka, Długi Kąt, Durlasy, Gąski, Gibałka, Gnaty, Kurpiewskie, Łęg Przedmiejski, Łęg Starościński, Lelis, Łodziska, Nasiadki, Obierwia, Olszewka, Płoszyce, Siemnocha, Szafarczyska, Szafarnia, Szkwa, Szwendrowy Most and Walery.

Neighbouring gminas
Gmina Lelis is bordered by the gminas of Baranowo, Kadzidło, Miastkowo, Olszewo-Borki, Rzekuń and Zbójna.

References

Polish official population figures 2006

Lelis
Ostrołęka County